Aidan Thomas is an English football midfielder who plays for Westfields after leaving Hereford United of League Two in May 2011.

Playing career
Thomas, a Hereford United youth team graduate, was handed the number 19 shirt for the 2010–11 season, signing a one-year professional deal. However, he started his professional career battling against injury. He recovered to make his debut on 6 November 2010, replacing Rob Purdie 75 minutes into a 5–1 home win over Hythe Town in the FA Cup First Round. His second appearance came in the Fourth Round of the competition, he replaced James McQuilkin on 81 minutes as Sheffield Wednesday won 4–1 at Hillsborough on 29 January 2011. In March 2011 he joined AFC Telford United on a months loan in order to gain first team experience. He was released by Hereford at the end of the season after failing to break into the first team, he then joined local side Westfields. He had a trial with Stoke city in April 2012.

After taking a year away from football in order to go traveling in New Zealand, Thomas returned to Westfields for the 2015–16 season. Thomas is famous amongst his peers for his catchphrase: “he who dares, wins”

Club stats
As of 16 June 2011.

References

External links

Profile at the official Hereford United site

Living people
English footballers
Association football midfielders
Hereford United F.C. players
AFC Telford United players
Westfields F.C. players
Year of birth missing (living people)